In the mathematical field of graph theory, an antiprism graph is a graph that has one of the antiprisms as its skeleton. An -sided antiprism has  vertices and  edges. They are regular, polyhedral (and therefore by necessity also 3-vertex-connected, vertex-transitive, and planar graphs), and also Hamiltonian graphs.

Examples
The first graph in the sequence, the octahedral graph, has 6 vertices and 12 edges. Later graphs in the sequence may be named after the type of antiprism they correspond to:

 Octahedral graph – 6 vertices, 12 edges
 square antiprismatic graph – 8 vertices, 16 edges
 Pentagonal antiprismatic graph – 10 vertices, 20 edges
 Hexagonal antiprismatic graph – 12 vertices, 24 edges
 Heptagonal antiprismatic graph – 14 vertices, 28 edges
 Octagonal antiprismatic graph – 16 vertices, 32 edges
 ...

Although geometrically the star polygons also form the faces of a different sequence of (self-intersecting) antiprisms, the star antiprisms, they do not form a different sequence of graphs.

Related graphs
An antiprism graph is a special case of a circulant graph, Ci2n(2,1). 

Other infinite sequences of polyhedral graph formed in a similar way from polyhedra with regular-polygon bases include the prism graphs (graphs of prisms) and wheel graphs (graphs of pyramids). Other vertex-transitive polyhedral graphs include the Archimedean graphs.

References

External links
 

Graph families
Regular graphs
Planar graphs